John Macaluso (born January 21, 1968) is an American drummer who has played for bands such as Ark, TNT, and Yngwie Malmsteen. Born in Commack, New York, Macaluso started playing drums at age 11. He has recorded over 200 records and played multiple world tours. He also runs clinics and teaches others.

Biography

Education
John Macaluso began his studies with his friend and mentor, Joe Franco (Good Rats), of whom Macaluso says, "his playing and teaching changed my life". He later began instruction under Rod Morgenstein (Dixie Dregs), Dom Famularo and Tommy Aldridge (Ozzy Osbourne). At the age of 18, he left his hometown for California to attend the Percussion Institute of Technology, where he studied under Ralph Humphrey (Frank Zappa), Casey Schuerelle, and Joey Heredia. That same year, Macaluso was hired for his first tour, and recorded with guitarist Paul Hansen in Germany.

Early career
Soon after John's first recording session, he met guitarist Alex Masi, who he went on to tour and record with from 1987 until this day. John appears on several of Alex's solo records, such as Vertical Invader and the writing collaboration Late Nights At Deserts Rim Rock. The two would then go on to record with bassist Randy Coven to form the trio MCM, Masi, Coven, Macaluso. MCM released the critically acclaimed album, Ritual Factory and its live counterpart, MCM Live 1900 Hard Times.

John joined Powermad in the late 1980s and released Absolute Power on Warner Bros. Records. Movie director David Lynch had come across Absolute Power while writing the Nicolas Cage film, Wild at Heart. Lynch enjoyed the album so much that he decided to feature the track Slaughter House in one scene of the movie. Powermad was flown to California and John Macaluso makes his motion picture debut in two scenes with actors Nicolas Cage and Laura Dern. Wild at Heart went on to win the Cannes Film Festival First Place Prize. After touring for almost a year straight, John would end his tenure with Powermad and join the Norwegian-based juggernaut, TNT.

The main riff of the Powermad song Slaughterhouse was also featured as the backing track of an animated self-promotional ad frequently running on MTV Europe in the early 1990s. 

John recorded two albums with TNT (one live, one studio) and toured around the globe until the band's demise in 1992. Shortly thereafter, John returned to New York to join Riot, replacing Bobby Jarzombek (Rob Halford). Riot toured extensively, spanning Europe, Japan and the United States on several occasions. Riot then had John appear on The Brethren of the Long House; after this, John left.

Influence on Progressive Metal
John crossed paths with the guitarist Tore Østby in Toten, Norway and the two had an immediate musical amalgamation of styles in the realm of a heavy groove, progressive rock mixed with a Latin feel. Blending flamenco guitars, double bass drumming and Pink Floyd-like moods, this sound would go on to form the progressive metal band known as Ark. Exploding with incredible reviews on their two albums, Ark impressed fans from around the world with their originality and live performances. Consisting of the world-renowned vocalist Jørn Lande, bassist Randy Coven (Mountain, Malmsteen), and Mats Olausson (Malmsteen), the band's short history has made history to some. John Macaluso played a vital role in the band's formation, writing and recording, having the two albums, ARK and Burn the Sun, under his belt.

John Macaluso would soon gain the attention and favor of guitarist Yngwie Malmsteen, using the first Ark album as the platform to jump to his next project. Yngwie flipped over John's playing and loved Ark so much that he instantly hired John to fly down to Florida to rehearse and record Alchemy. It was this album that proved be a benchmark for John, having a drum solo on the record and being the only drummer ever to record a drum solo on a Yngwie Malmsteen album. John spent three years recording four albums with Malmsteen, spanning multiple world tours. After his tenure with the Swedish guitar god, John reunited with former Ark members to write and record music until the band's split in 2003.

Composing and Recording
The taste of songwriting, both lyrically and musically, was now inspiring John to do more than just drumming. His passion for recording drove him to record dozens of records after the demise of Ark. John says, "Playing with different musicians and people who play different styles of music thrills me. I learn something new every session and record a history for myself by doing so, I never get bored". John spent a short time touring with guitarist George Lynch of Dokken, travelling all over the United States.

After attending The NAMM Show in California, John learns from drummer Mike Portnoy of Dream Theater that his singer, James LaBrie, was looking for a drummer to bring on tour for his solo record Elements Of Persuasion. With Mike's recommendation, John receives the call from James and finds himself touring the world yet again. John claims, "This was one of my favorite tours ever, such a great time and great grooving band." He would later satisfy his taste for writing again and put out a solo record where he is joined by friends and fellow musicians James LaBrie and guitarist from the band, Marco Sfogli.

During his free time on and off the road John would write and record beats, fills and document the techniques and theories that he claims had given him a style and a sound like no other. He would later organize and publish his documentation in a drum method book entitled Repercussions. John says, "The book is not just a book of beats and fills but besides that, it's a book on opening your creativity on the drum kit. I feel the most important thing a drummer could have is a personal signature. This book will show you ways to build on that, through drum sound and tuning, hand techniques, recording tips and stories, learning when not to play, playing to a click and the three major ways to do it. This covers moments in time that have changed my life and the lives of drummers worldwide. It’s not drumming as a hobby, but drumming as a lifestyle. It’s stories and graphics including a CD that can also entertain even non-drummers." John's book is endorsed by drummers Joe Franco, Nicko McBrain (Iron Maiden) and Bobby Jarzombek (Rob Halford).

Now having a resume which includes records with artists such as Delmar Brown (Sting), KRS-One, Felicia Collins and Hernan Romero, John soon found himself back with his old friend from TNT, singer Tony Harnell to form Starbreaker. Starbreaker was well received by music fans, journalists and critics alike. John now continues to perform with friend and world renowned pianist, Vitalij Kuprij. The two have a duo that tours and performs. John has recorded two of Vitalij's studio albums, namely Vitalij Kuprij’s Revenge and Galacial Inferno.

On 2012, after some collaborations with the guitar player Pier Gonella, Macaluso joined the band Mastercastle, recording the drums of their album On Fire.

In April 2013 he joined Symphony X until their drummer Jason Rullo recovers from health problems, supporting them on some South American and European tour dates.

In September 2016, it was announced that Macaluso joined Italian band Labyrinth.

Solo career
Macaluso was approached by Lion Music for publishing and distribution his first solo album, John Macaluso & UNION RADIO. It took a year and a half to be written and recorded and it saw Macaluso travel to Italy to write and record with Marco Sfogli (James LaBrie), to France for keyboards, Pennsylvania for piano with Vitalij Kuprij, Canada for vocals with James LaBrie, California for guitar with Alex Masi, aside from England, New Jersey and New York, where he recorded his drum parts.

Collaborations and guests 
John has recorded and toured with the following musicians and artists:
 Yngwie Malmsteen
 James LaBrie (Dream Theater)
 Symphony X
 Ark
 TNT
 Riot
 KRS-ONE
 Nicolas Cage (for the movie Wild at Heart, winner of Cannes film festival 1989)
 Nicko McBrain (Iron Maiden)
 Pete Steele (Type O Negative)
 Danny Spitz (Anthrax)
 Starbreaker
 Van Helsing's Curse (Dee Snider solo show)
 Felicia Collins (David Letterman Show)
 Dino Jelusic (Animal Drive)
 Powermad (David Lynch's Wild at Heart movie)
 Dee Snider (Twisted Sister)
 Spread Eagle
 Metal Mike (Rob Halford)
 George Lynch (Dokken)
 M.A.V. Magni Animi Viri
 Alex Masi
 Chris Caffery (Trans-Siberian Orchestra)
 Vitalij Kuprij
 Danny Miranda (Queen)
 Paul Hanson
 Masterlast
 Bobby Hamble (Biohazard)
 Fiona Flanegan
 The Good Rats
 John West
 Mastercastle
 MCM
 Randy Coven
 Marco Sfogli
 HolyHell
 Hernon Romero (Al Di Meola's band)
 V.O.X.
 Tony Bongiovi (producer of Bon Jovi)
 Tommy Newton (producer Helloween/Ufo)
 Dave Eggar (Evanescence)
 Mistheria
 Pier Gonella
 Conspiracy (with Anthony Bambino and Fabrizio V. Zee Grossi)
 Rustfield
 BASTIAN
 Michael Romeo (Symphony X)
 Unwritten Pages

References

Citations

External links
 

TNT (Norwegian band) members
Living people
People from Commack, New York
Musicians from New York (state)
1968 births
20th-century American drummers
American male drummers
Riot (band) members
Starbreaker (band) members
Ark (Norwegian band) members
Mastercastle members
Labyrinth (band) members
20th-century American male musicians
Yngwie J. Malmsteen's Rising Force members